Gianni Hecht Lucari (5 September 1922, in Wien – 27 August 1998, in Roma) was an Italian film producer, and production manager. Lucari was born in Vienna, Austria of Austrian, Jewish, and French ancestry. He died in Rome, Italy at the age of 76. Lucari produced many films from 1954 to 1980.

During World War II he served with the British Army as an Italian Intelligence liaison officer. After the war, in 1950, he started a film studio, Documento Films, which produced featurettes, documentaries and television programs. In 1953 he produced his first feature film Un giorno in pretura a four case courtroom drama and starring Sophia Loren in one of them.

Selected filmography
 A Day in Court (1954)

See also
 Cinema of Italy
 Italian neorealism
 Commedia all'italiana
 Sword and sandal

Notes

External links 
 

Italian film producers
Italian people of Austrian descent
Italian people of French descent
Austrian Jews
Film people from Rome
1922 births
1998 deaths
David di Donatello winners
Austrian emigrants to Italy